Zane Troy Frazier (born July 16, 1966) is an American former karateka, kickboxer and mixed martial artist who competed in the heavyweight division. After a successful career in karate during the 1980s in which he won numerous international accolades, Frazier then turned his hand to kickboxing and became a United States and North American champion. After taking part at the inaugural Ultimate Fighting Championship event in 1993, he would continue his career in MMA until retiring in 2008.

Early life
The son of Floyd and Bertha Frazier, he grew up in a Crips infested neighborhood in Los Angeles, California, and began training in martial arts in 1972 after seeing the film Fist of Fury.

Frazier graduated from Fairfax High School in 1980, and was recruited to play college basketball at the University of Idaho in Moscow under head coach Don Monson. In addition to his martial arts career, he later tried out for the New Jersey Jets.

Although his birth year is often given as 1966, this is age fabrication; he is four to five years older

Career
Frazier attained the rank of fourth degree black belt in American Kenpo karate and was the winner of the California, United States and North American karate championships in 1984 before becoming the international karate champion in 1987 and again in 1990. After making the transition to kickboxing, he won the World Kickboxing Federation (WKF) United States super heavyweight title in 1993.

On November 12, 1993, Frazier competed at UFC 1, a no-holds-barred fighting tournament and the very first mixed martial arts event held by the Ultimate Fighting Championship. He reportedly earned his place in the tournament by beating up Frank Dux in a street fight which was witnessed by UFC founders Rorion Gracie and Art Davie. Gracie and Davie had come to Los Angeles to scout the U.S. karate championships for potential fighters but saw Frazier and Dux's brawl beforehand. Frazier claims that he had been teaching classes for Dux and that Dux hadn't paid him; Dux disputes that account and says that Frazier sucker punched him while wearing brass knuckles. In the UFC 1 tournament quarterfinals, he faced fellow kickboxer Kevin Rosier in what turned out to be a sloppy brawl. The match ended with Rosier clubbing Frazier to the floor with a series of blows to the back of the head, then stomping on him before Frazier's corner threw in the towel. Frazier suffered respiratory failure and was rushed to hospital after the fight.

He returned to kickboxing the following year to win the WKF North American Super Heavyweight Championship but took his second MMA bout in September 1995 when he fought at Shooto: Vale Tudo Perception in Tokyo, Japan, knocking out Kendo Nagasaki thirty-six seconds into the fight. Having amassed a 17–0 kickboxing record in the United States, Frazier made his K-1 debut at K-1 Hercules in Nagoya, Japan on December 9, 1995 against Takeru and suffered his first defeat at the hands of the Seido karate stylist as he succumbed to a barrage of knees and punches in round two.

Frazier then made his way back to the UFC in May 1996 at UFC 9 and was defeated via technical knockout by Cal Worsham three minutes into the fight. In his second and last outing in K-1, he went up against Nobuaki Kakuda at K-1 Revenge '96 in Osaka, Japan on September 1, 1996. Despite having a massive size advantage, Frazier was knocked down with a low kick in round four and lost by unanimous decision.

Following this, Frazier continued his career in MMA and in his next fight against Sidney "Mestre Hulk" Gonçalves Freitas in Brazil, he was knocked out after falling from the ring and hitting his head on the floor. After this, he continued to fight throughout the 1990s and 2000s and recorded mostly losses. His final fight came in January 2008 and he was knocked out by Richard Blake.

Championships and awards

Karate
California Karate Championships
California Karate Championship (1991)
California Karate Championship (1992)
International Karate Championships
International Karate Championship (1987)
International Karate Championship (1990)
North American Karate Championships
North American Heavyweight Karate Championship (1984)
North Western Karate Championships
North Western Karate Championship (1984)
USA Karate Championships
USA Heavyweight Karate Championship (1984)

Kickboxing
World Kickboxing Federation
WKF United States Super Heavyweight Championship
WKF North American Super Heavyweight Championship

Mixed martial arts
Worldwide Fighting Championship
WFC Heavyweight Championship

Kickboxing record

|-
|-  bgcolor="#FFBBBB"
| 1996-09-01 || Loss ||align=left| Nobuaki Kakuda || K-1 Revenge '96 || Osaka, Japan || Decision (unanimous) || 5 || 3:00 || 17–2
|-
|-  bgcolor="#FFBBBB"
| 1995-12-09 || Loss ||align=left| Takeru || K-1 Hercules || Nagoya, Japan || KO (right hook) || 2 || 0:45 || 17–1
|-
|-
| colspan=9 | Legend:

Mixed martial arts record

|-
| Loss
| align=center| 4–11
| Richard Blake
| KO (punches)
| NoLimit Fighting: Heavy Hands
| 
| align=center| 1
| align=center| 1:56
| Dallas, Texas, United States
| 
|-
| Win
| align=center| 4–10
| Melville Calabaca
| TKO (punches)
| WFC: Fight Club
| 
| align=center| 1
| align=center| 0:43
| Loveland, Colorado, United States
| 
|-
| Win
| align=center| 3–10
| Ron Rumpf
| KO (punches)
| WFC: Clash of the Titans
| 
| align=center| 1
| align=center| 1:15
| Denver, Colorado, United States
| 
|-
| Loss
| align=center| 2–10
| Aaron Brink
| TKO (punches)
| WEC 3
| 
| align=center| 1
| align=center| 1:00
| Lemoore, California, United States
| 
|-
| Loss
| align=center| 2–9
| Mark Smith
| TKO (punches)
| Ultimate Pankration 1
| 
| align=center| 1
| align=center| 1:33
| Cabazon, California, United States
| 
|-
| Win
| align=center| 2–8
| Giant Ochiai
| Decision (unanimous)
| KOTC 10: Critical Mass
| 
| align=center| 1
| align=center| 7:00
| California, United States
| 
|-
| Loss
| align=center| 1–8
| Bobby Hoffman
| Submission (armbar)
| RINGS USA: Battle of Champions
| 
| align=center| 1
| align=center| 1:34
| Council Bluffs, Iowa, United States
| 
|-
| Loss
| align=center| 1–7
| Jason Godsey
| Submission (rear naked choke)
| Extreme Challenge 23
| 
| align=center| 1
| align=center| 0:45
| Indianapolis, Indiana, United States
| 
|-
| Loss
| align=center| 1–6
| Dick Vrij
| KO (punch)
| RINGS Holland: Judgement Day
| 
| align=center| 1
| align=center| 2:34
| Amsterdam, Netherlands
| 
|-
| Loss
| align=center| 1–5
| Vasily Kudin
| TKO (submission to punches)
| 1st Absolute Fighting World Cup Pankration
| 
| align=center| 1
| align=center| 6:31
| Tel Aviv, Israel
| 
|-
| Loss
| align=center| 1–4
| Wes Gassaway
| TKO (submission to punches)
| IFC 4: Akwesasane
| 
| align=center| 1
| align=center| 2:26
| Hogansburg, New York, United States
| 
|-
| Loss
| align=center| 1–3
| Mestre Hulk
| KO (fall from ring)
| World Vale Tudo Championship 3
| 
| align=center| 1
| align=center| 2:00
| Brazil
| 
|-
| Loss
| align=center| 1–2
| Cal Worsham
| TKO (punches)
| UFC 9
| 
| align=center| 1
| align=center| 3:14
| Detroit, Michigan, United States
| 
|-
| Win
| align=center| 1–1
| Kendo Nagasaki
| KO (punch)
| Shooto: Vale Tudo Perception
| 
| align=center| 1
| align=center| 0:36
| Tokyo, Japan
| 
|-
| Loss
| align=center| 0–1
| Kevin Rosier
| TKO (corner stoppage)
| UFC 1
| 
| align=center| 1
| align=center| 4:20
| Denver, Colorado, United States
|

References

External links
 
 K-1Sport profile
 
 

Living people
1966 births
American male kickboxers
Kickboxers from California
Heavyweight kickboxers
American male mixed martial artists
Mixed martial artists from California
Heavyweight mixed martial artists
African-American mixed martial artists
American male karateka
Mixed martial artists utilizing American Kenpo
Mixed martial artists utilizing shootfighting
Idaho Vandals men's basketball players
Sportspeople from Los Angeles
People from Hollywood, Los Angeles
American men's basketball players
Ultimate Fighting Championship male fighters
21st-century African-American people
20th-century African-American sportspeople